The 2021 FC Ordabasy season was the 19th successive season that Ordabasy played in the Kazakhstan Premier League, the highest tier of association football in Kazakhstan.

Season events
On 26 February, Ordabasy announced the signing of Bagdat Kairov from Kaisar, with Chidi Osuchukwu joining from Tom Tomsk the following day, and Temirlan Yerlanov from Tobol on 28 February.  and 

On 12 March, Ordabasy announced the signing of Yerkebulan Tungyshbayev from Kairat.

On 19 July, Ordabasy signed Muhammadjon Rakhimov from Istiklol.

On 4 August, Ordabasy announced the signing of Dmytro Khlyobas from Kolos Kovalivka.

Squad

Transfers

In

Loans in

Released

Friendlies

Competitions

Overview

Premier League

Results summary

Results by round

Results

League table

Kazakhstan Cup

Group stage

Squad statistics

Appearances and goals

|-
|colspan="16"|Players away from Ordabasy on loan:
|-
|colspan="16"|Players who left Ordabasy during the season:

|}

Goal scorers

Clean sheets

Disciplinary record

References

External links

FC Ordabasy seasons
Ordabasy